Eiji Maruo (丸尾 英司, born  April 26, 1976) is a Japanese former professional baseball pitcher in Japan's Nippon Professional Baseball. He played with the Orix BlueWave in 1995 and from 1997 to 1998, and the Osaka Kintetsu Buffaloes in 2000.

External links

1976 births
Living people
Baseball people from Hyōgo Prefecture
Japanese baseball players
Nippon Professional Baseball pitchers
Osaka Kintetsu Buffaloes players
Orix BlueWave players
People from Himeji, Hyōgo